25 Live (also known as the 25th-Anniversary Tour) was a concert tour by English singer/songwriter George Michael. The tour was the most commercially successful tour of 2006–2007 in Europe, grossing over $200 million, with positive reviews from music critics. The 106 tour shows were performed in 41 countries and seen by 1.3 million fans across the globe.

History
It was Michael's first tour in over 15 years. The tour, running for 50 dates, began in Barcelona on 23 September and was intended to end at Wembley Arena in London in December, but—due to great feedback from fans—continued into 2007 providing more gigs throughout Europe, concluding in Belfast. The tour is described as "a celebration of his 25-year career in music", and was accompanied by a Greatest Hits album, released in late 2006. The news of the tour came amid increased media speculation about Michael's personal life, in particular, his drug use and sex life. After the success of the autumn leg, new shows were added for summer 2007, in large arenas and stadiums. Pop star Sophie Ellis-Bextor was announced as the supporting act for six of the eight UK shows. She did not open the show at Wembley Stadium as Michael was the first artist ever to play in the new stadium.

On 25 March 2008, a third Leg of the 25 LIVE Tour was announced for North America. This leg included 21 dates in the United States and Canada. This was Michael's first tour of North America in 17 years. The tour coincided with the release of his new Greatest Hits album on 1 April 2008.

The tour ended with two concerts at Earls Court in London named "The Final Two". Wham! fans would recognize the reference to Wham!'s last gig at Wembley Stadium in London in 1986, The Final. Another final concert was later announced. The concert was held in Copenhagen, Denmark, on 30 August and called The Final One. Australian dates were added in November 2009, involving stops in Perth, Sydney, and later Melbourne in February/March 2010.

Commercial reception

Ticket sales in Europe were brisk. Within two hours of initial sales, 240,000 tickets were snatched up by eager fans. First to sell out were UK shows in London's Wembley Arena and Earls Court as well as Birmingham's NEC Arena and Manchester MEN Arena. The Manchester show sold out within minutes, and the two 25 Live dates added to the venue were sold out by lunchtime. To meet demand, 14 gigs were added to the tour, including three additional shows in London alone. Michael's dates around Europe were met with equally extraordinary enthusiasm. In Norway, the Oslo show at the Oslo Spektrum sold out in an hour and a half. In Copenhagen, 49,000 tickets sold out at the Parken Stadium in just three hours. The first Rotterdam concert at Rotterdam Ahoy arena sold out in a mere six minutes, and the second saw tickets vanish in 16 minutes. In fact, a third Rotterdam show was added by popular demand that also sold out in 16 minutes. This unprecedented response has stood out as the fastest sell of tickets ever experienced by Barrie Marshall, whose London-based promotion firm, Marshall Arts Limited, has been promoting shows for 30 years.

The 25 Live tour broke several ticket sales records, most notably in Copenhagen. Michael's concert at Parken Stadium sold over 50,000 tickets in the matter of minutes, shattering the previous ticket sales record at the venue, formerly held by U2.

In North America, although ticket sales weren't fast as they were in Europe, every venue was sold out in time for the concert. For a period of 25 hours during the week leading up to the Los Angeles show on 25 June 2008, tickets were sold for a promotional price of $25 (down from $95) in celebration of George Michael's birthday, 25 June 1963.

All the tickets for the Final Two shows in London and the Finale One show in Denmark were sold out in 2 hours.

Ticket sales for the Australian leg were also brisk, the concerts in Perth at the 25,000 seat Burswood Dome and the 42,000 seat Sydney Football Stadium both being sellouts.

The Finals
On 11 June 2008, two dates were added, titled "The Final Two", taking place in Earls Court, London on 24 and 25 August 2008. These concerts were filmed for a 25 LIVE DVD release entitled "Live in London".

On 30 June 2008, Michael announced one more last show in Copenhagen at Copenhagen's Parken Stadium on 30 August. This special performance, entitled "The Final One", allowed Michael to say "thank you" to his loyal fans, not only in Scandinavia, but also across Europe.

On 1 November 2008, Michael announced another last concert. This time it was held at the Mohammed Bin Zayed Stadium on 1 December 2008, in Abu Dhabi, UAE. It was the first event to be held at the new stadium and was billed as the biggest concert ever held in the UAE. It was also his first concert in the Middle East. The event also helped to launch National Day celebrations and an outdoor extravaganza of fireworks and lasers gave fans a spectacular and unforgettable experience.

Set list

First leg
 "Waiting (Reprise)"
 "Flawless (Go to the City)"
 "Fastlove"
 "Father Figure"
 "Star People '97"
 "The First Time Ever I Saw Your Face"
 "Praying for Time"
 "Too Funky"
 "You Have Been Loved"
 "Everything She Wants"
 "My Mother Had a Brother"
 "Shoot the Dog" Break
 "Faith"
 "Spinning the Wheel"
 "Jesus to a Child"
 "An Easier Affair"
 "A Different Corner"
 "Amazing"
 "I'm Your Man"
 "Outside"Encore
 "Careless Whisper"
 "Freedom! '90"

Second leg
 "Waiting (Reprise)"
 "Flawless (Go to the City)"
 "Fastlove"
 "Precious Box"
 "Father Figure"
 "Everything She Wants"
 "Ticking"
 "Praying for Time"
 "Too Funky"
 "Star People '97"
 "Shoot the Dog"Break
 "Faith"
 "Spinning the Wheel"
 "An Easier Affair"
 "Jesus to a Child"
 "Amazing"
 "I'm Your Man"
 "Outside"Encore
 "Careless Whisper"
 "Freedom! '90"

Third leg
 "Waiting (Reprise)"
 "Fastlove"
 "I'm Your Man"
 "The First Time Ever I Saw Your Face"
 "Father Figure"
 "Hard Day"
 "Everything She Wants"
 "One More Try"
 "A Different Corner"
 "An Easier Affair"
 "Too Funky"
 "Star People'97"Break
 "Faith"
 "Feeling Good"
 "Roxanne"
 "Spinning the Wheel"
 "Kissing a Fool"
 "Amazing"
 "Flawless (Go to the City)"
 "Outside"
 "Praying For Time"Encore
 "Careless Whisper"
 "Freedom 90"

Forth leg (Finals)
 "Waiting (Reprise)"
 "Fastlove"
 "I'm Your Man"
 "Father Figure"
 "You Have Been Loved"
 "Everything She Wants"
 "Precious Box"
 "One More Try"
 "Jesus to a Child"
 "An Easier Affair"
 "Too Funky"
 "Shoot the Dog"Break
 "Faith"
 "Spinning the Wheel"
 "Feeling Good"
 "Roxanne"
 "My Mother Had a Brother"
 "Kissing a Fool"
 "Amazing"
 "Flawless (Go to the City)"
 "Fantasy"
 "Outside"Encore
 "Careless Whisper"
 "Freedom! '90"

Tour dates

Cancelled dates

Personnel

Band
 George Michael – vocals
 Chris Cameron – musical director/arranger
 Lea Mullen – percussion
 Phil Palmer – guitars
 Andy Hamilton – sax, keyboards, Ewi
 Steve Walters – bass
 Mike Brown – guitars
 Carlos Hercules – drums
 Graham Kearns – guitars
 Luke Smith – keyboards
 Shirley Lewis – backing vocals
 Jay Henry – backing vocals
 Lincoln Jean-Marie – backing vocals
 Lori Perry – backing vocals
 Sharon Perry – backing vocals
 Lucy Jules – backing vocals

Management and production
 Michael Lippman – artist manager
 Andy Stephens – artist manager
 Ken Watts – tour director
 Lisa Johnson – assistant tour director
 Looloo Murphy – GM tour manager
 Sharon Ashley – band tour manager
 Ronnie Franklin – security consultant
 Mark Spring – production manager
 Di Eichorst – production coordinator
 Scott Chase – stage manager
 James Kelly – show manager
 Willie Williams – video staging designer and director
 Vince Foster – set and lighting design and operator
 Gary Bradshaw – front of house sound
 Andy Bramley – video director
 Simeon Niel-Asher  – Osteopath
 Barrie Marshall and Doris Dixon – agents

Promoters
 Belgium – Live Nation
 Denmark – DKB & Motor
 France – Interconcerts
 Germany – Peter Rieger Konzertagentur
 Greece – Cosmote
 Netherlands – MOJO Concerts
 Hungary – Live Nation Hungary (previously Multimedia Concerts)
 Ireland – Aiken Promotions
 Italy – D'Alessandro E Galli
 Norway – Gunnar Eide
 Spain – Sagliocco Group
 Sweden – EMA Telstar
 Switzerland – Good News
 UK – Marshall Arts
 USA – Live Nation
 Australia – Paul Dainty

Critical reception
The tour received positive reviews, with praise for the set list and overall production of the show.

Features
25 Live Tour features the first time a 3000 piece LED screen has been used.
25 Live Tour features a three dimensional video wall. The video screen is not just a backdrop to the stage, it also lies on the stage surface. Paul McCartney used a similar concept in his 2005 US Tour.
25 Live tour features the first time that motion tracking comes from the artist to video.
25 Live Tour features the first time 490 frequency channels are transmitted to the audio mixing board, producing dynamic, richer sound for the performance
25 Live Tour features the first time that on-screen visuals respond to the musicians performing.

Other details
On 20 December 2006 George Michael made special free concert for NHS nurses in the Roundhouse, North London. George claimed he wanted to thank the nurses who had cared for his late mother.
On 31 December 2006 George Michael was paid $3 million for a 75-minute private concert in Moscow, Russia, which made him the highest paid entertainer in Russian history.
George Michael became the first music artist to perform at the new Wembley Stadium when he played two shows at the venue on 9 June 2007 and 10 June 2007 during his 25 Live tour.
During his concert in Sofia, Bulgaria George Michael devoted to the Bulgarian nurses prosecuted in the HIV trial in Libya.
 On 17 June 2008 George Michael launched the NA leg of his final world tour by congratulating lawmakers for legalising gay marriage in California.
On 25 June 2008, during the L.A. concert, George celebrated his 45th birthday. The band played "Happy Birthday", while Bo Derek walked on stage with a huge birthday cake.
On 27 July 2008, George Michael's concert at TD Banknorth Garden in Boston was delayed 1½ hours due to weather conditions and flight delays. He later apologized for the delay and despite the holdup, played a full 3-hour set.

Notes

References

External links
 Official website
 25Live Archives on George Michael Forums
 Concert Photos
 George Michael Tour Archive

George Michael concert tours
2006 concert tours
2007 concert tours
2008 concert tours